Steffen Sartor (née Skel, born 14 June 1972, in Bad Salzungen, Bezirk Suhl) is a German luger who competed from 1992 to 2004. He was a doubles specialised who formed a successful partnership with Steffen Wöller during the 1990s and early 2000. He won five medals at the FIL World Luge Championships with one gold (Mixed team: 2000), three silvers (Men's doubles: 2000, 2001; Mixed team: 2001), and one bronze (Men's doubles: 1997).

Skel also won six medals at the FIL European Luge Championships with three golds (Mixed team: 2002, 2004, 2006) and three silvers (Men's doubles: 1998, 2000; Mixed team: 2000).

His best finish at the Winter Olympics was fourth in the men's doubles event at Salt Lake City in 2002.

Skel won the overall Luge World Cup men's doubles title in 2000-1.

Following his retirement from competition, he became a luge coach for the Canadian, German and Swiss federations. In 2013 he was appointed as the coach for the South Korean luge team on a contract running until 2018.

He is married to former skeleton slider Diana Sartor. The couple have two children: Malin and Silas.

References
FIL-Luge profile
Hickok sports information on World champions in luge and skeleton.
List of European luge champions 
List of men's doubles luge World Cup champions since 1978.
USA Today profile on Sartor and her relationship to Skel

Specific

External links
 
 
 

1972 births
Living people
German male lugers
German sports coaches
Olympic lugers of Germany
Lugers at the 1994 Winter Olympics
Lugers at the 1998 Winter Olympics
Lugers at the 2002 Winter Olympics
People from Bad Salzungen
People from Bezirk Suhl
Sportspeople from Thuringia
20th-century German people
21st-century German people